No Breathing is a 2013 South Korean sports film set in the world of competitive swimming, starring Seo In-guk, Lee Jong-suk and Kwon Yuri. The film was released in theaters on October 30, 2013. As of 2014, it sold approximately 451,669 admissions in Korea only.

Plot
Like his swimming champion father, Won-il (Seo In-guk) was once a promising swimmer. But when his father dies during a swimming competition (where he was doing his specialty called "no breathing"), soon followed by his mother's death, Won-il quits swimming for good. Instead, he lives life hopelessly and recklessly, like there is no tomorrow. With Won-il in danger of being expelled from school, his father's longtime friend Jae-suk (Park Chul-min) drags him to a physical education-focused high school, hoping that he'll start swimming again. There he meets his long-ago rival, Woo-sang (Lee Jong-suk) who in the past had always been overshadowed by Won-il. With Won-il's absence from the sport, Woo-sang is now in first place and is a national swimming star. But he gets disqualified from the national tryouts after getting into trouble, so he has to start from ground zero and ends up at the same phys-ed school as Won-il. Woo-sang is Won-il's complete opposite in personality, and all he cares about is winning so he finds Won-il's return to the sport unwelcome. Then there is Jae-suk's daughter, Jung-eun (Kwon Yuri) who captures both Won-il and Woo-sang's hearts and further reignites the rivalry between them. The two very different young men begin training for an upcoming swimming competition, battling for love and friendship as they undergo the rite of passage of growing up.

Cast

Main characters
Seo In-guk as Jo Won-il
Yoo Seung-yong as young Won-il
 A swimming prodigy who stopped participating in the sport, and now wants to make a comeback. He is a headstrong, impulsive, and live-for-the-moment kind of guy.
Lee Jong-suk as Jung Woo-sang
Nam Da-reum as young Woo-sang
 A national swimmer who is uptight and aloof, and hails from a privileged family.
Kwon Yuri as Jung-eun
Kim Bo-min as young Jung-eun
 A girl with a carefree personality who dreams of becoming a musician. She grew up with the boys as children.

Supporting characters
Shin Min-chul as Jung-dong
Kim Jae-young as Dae-chan
Park Chul-min as Jae-suk
Park Jung-chul as Coach Jang
Sunwoo Jae-duk as Woo-sang's father
Ah Young as Se-mi
Oh In-hye as High school female coach
Jeon Bo-mi as Ha-na
Kim Nam-hee as Won's friend 
Lee Chang-joo as Woo-hyun
Park Hyun-woo as Jo Min-gook
Jung Min-sung as announcer
Park Yong-sik as head of swimming association
Kim Young-sun as Woo-sang's mother
Kim Jung-hak as reporter Han

Production 
The film began shooting on May 19, 2013. One of the locations was Davao in the Philippines, where the overseas field training scenes were shot, as well as the movie poster.

Release

South Korea 
On the day of its release on October 30, 2013, No Breathing drew 44,707 admissions and ranked 4th on the Korean box office. The film sold a total of 451,669 tickets during its domestic run, grossing  (or ).

International 
The film also received a theatrical release in other Asian countries in December 2013, namely Singapore (December 5), Hong Kong (December 12), Taiwan (December 13), and Vietnam (December 28). The film grossed over $22,655 on its opening weekend in Singapore, grossing $38,740 during its two-week run. On its opening weekend in Hong Kong, it grossed $35,728 and a total of $53,729 at the end of its run.

Soundtrack 
On October 22, 2013, CJ E&M Music released two singles for the film, both sung by Kwon Yuri: "Bling Star" and "반짝반짝 (Twinkle Twinkle)."

References

External links 
  
 
 
 

2010s sports drama films
South Korean teen drama films
South Korean sports drama films
South Korean coming-of-age drama films
2010s Korean-language films
Swimming films
2013 films
Films set in the Philippines
Films shot in the Philippines
2013 drama films
2010s South Korean films